Chaudhry Mohammad Awais was a Pakistani politician who had been member of the Provincial Assembly of the Punjab between 1946 and 1954.

References

Punjab, Pakistan MLAs 1947–1949
Punjab, Pakistan MLAs 1951–1955
Chaudhry family (Jhelum)
People from Jhelum District
Punjabi people